A trade fair, also known as trade show, trade exhibition, or trade exposition, is an exhibition organized so that companies in a specific industry can showcase and demonstrate their latest products and services, meet with industry partners and customers, study activities of rivals, and examine recent market trends and opportunities.

In contrast to consumer fairs, only some trade fairs are open to the public, while others can only be attended by company representatives (members of the trade, e.g. professionals) and members of the press, therefore trade shows are classified as either "public" or "trade only". A few fairs are hybrids of the two; one example is the Frankfurt Book Fair, which is trade only for its first three days and open to the general public on its final two days. They are held on a continuing basis in virtually all markets and normally attract companies from around the globe. For example, in the U.S., there are currently over 10,000 trade shows held every year, and several online directories have been established to help organizers, attendees, and marketers identify appropriate events.

History
Modern trade fairs follow in the tradition of trade fairs established in late medieval Europe such as the Champagne fairs or the Skåne Market, in the era of merchant capitalism.  In this era, produce and craft producers visited towns for trading fairs, to sell and showcase products. From the late eighteenth century, industrial exhibitions in Europe and North America became more common reflecting the technological dynamism of the Industrial Revolution.

In the late 19th century, the concept of annual industry-wide trade shows gained traction, spreading from European manufacturing centers to North America. By the 20th century, specialized companies came into existence simply to manage the trade-show industry, and permanent trade show grounds or convention centers were established as venues that featured a rotating calendar of trade shows.

In the 21st century, with the rapid industrialization of Asia, trade shows and exhibitions are now commonplace throughout the Asian continent, with China dominating the exhibitions industry in Asia, accounting for more than 55 per cent of all space sold in the region in 2011.

Use

Trade fairs play important roles in marketing as well as business networking in market sectors that use them. People will seek to meet people and companies at their own level in the supply chain, as well as potential suppliers and potential buyers.

Generally there will be a central trade show floor with booths where people exhibit their goods or services, and throughout the day there will be seminars for continuing education on matters relevant to the industry, like best practices, trends, and regulation. There will also be some shared meals with keynote speakers, and social events in the evenings.  Booths range from simple tables to elaborate constructions.

Trade fairs often involve a considerable investment in time and money by participating companies.  The planning includes arranging meetings with other attendees beforehand and resources to follow up on opportunities that are created at the fair. Costs include space rental, booth design and construction of trade show displays, telecommunications, travel, accommodations, and promotional literature and items to give to attendees.

In addition, costs are incurred at the show for services such as electrical, booth cleaning, internet services, and drayage (also known as material handling). This local spending on logistics leads cities to promote trade shows as a means of local economic development, as well as providing opportunities for local businesses to grow, and attract new businesses to come.

List of major venues

List of major trade fairs

See also 
 Agricultural show
 Buyers Market of American Craft
 County fair
 Lead retrieval
 List of world's fairs
 Rodeo
 State fair
 World's fair
 Hall of Nations

References

External links